The 8th Annual Shorty Awards, honoring the best in social media, took place on April 11, 2016, at The Times Center in New York City. The ceremony was hosted by YouTube comedian Mamrie Hart, who was accompanied by Flula Borg as the ceremony DJ. There was a musical performances from Nico & Vinz.

Influencer winners and nominees
Nominations were announced on January 19, 2016, with public voting closing on February 18, 2016.
Winners are listed first and in boldface.

Arts & Entertainment

Team Internet

Creative & Design

News & Media

Tech & Innovation

Content

Brand & Organization Winners

By Industry

Content and Media

Agency of the Year

Strategy & Engagement

By Campaign

By Use of Platform

By Overall Presence

References

External links
 

2016 awards in the United States
8
2016 in New York City
April 2016 events in the United States
2016 in Internet culture